Khakhrechi or Khakhrechi is a village of Malia and Rathore communities in Gujarat, India.

References

External links

Villages in Morbi district